Ban Meydan-e Abdollah (also Romanized as Bān Meydān-e ‘Abdollāh; also known as Bāmīān ‘Abdollāh, Bānmeydān, and Bān Meydān-e Soflā) is a village in Cheleh Rural District, in the Central District of Gilan-e Gharb County, Kermanshah Province, Iran. At the 2006 census, its population was 77, in 17 families.

References 

Populated places in Gilan-e Gharb County